William Florine Sarni (September 19, 1927 – April 15, 1983) was an American professional baseball player who played as a catcher in the Major Leagues. A native of Los Angeles, he played for the St. Louis Cardinals (1951–1952, 1954–1956) and New York Giants (1956).

Baseball career
In 33 games he went 19-for-83 (.229) with one home run and nine runs batted in.

Sarni made his major league debut with the Cardinals on May 11, 1951 at the age of 23. After hitting for only a .174 average during his rookie year, Sarni was sent back to the Columbus Red Birds in May 1952 in order to trim their roster down to the 25 player limit. He posted a .277 batting average along with 8 home runs and 60 runs batted in during the  season with Columbus and, earned a spot on the American Association All-Star team. In October 1953, the Cardinals purchased Sarni from Columbus.

Sarni became the Cardinals starting catcher when Del Rice was injured during a play at home plate on June 7, 1954. In 123 games he posted a .300 batting average with 9 home runs and 70 runs batted in. He also led National League catchers with a .996 fielding percentage and 12 double plays. One odd footnote from the 1954 season was a game in St. Louis on July 18 against the Philadelphia Phillies in which, both Sarni and Phillies catcher Stan Lopata played the game without wearing chest protectors because of the intense heat.

The Cardinals traded Rice to the Milwaukee Braves in June 1955 and, Sarni became their number one catcher.

Sarni took over as the Giants starting catcher and ended the year leading the league's catchers with 61 assists and 10 double plays. During spring training in 1957 he suffered a heart attack that ended his playing career. He was just 29 years old. The Giants kept him on by creating a coaching position for him. In  he signed a contract to coach for the Rochester Red Wings in the St. Louis Cardinals organisation, then resigned after one season to take up a career selling stocks and bonds for an investment firm.

Career statistics
In a 5-year major league career, Sarni played in 390 games, accumulating 311 hits in 1,182 at bats for a .263 career batting average along with 22 home runs, 151 runs batted in and an on-base percentage of .313. His lifetime fielding percentage was .991.

Sarni died at the age of 55 in Creve Coeur, Missouri.

References

1955 Baseball Register published by The Sporting News

External links

Bill Sarni at Baseball Library

1927 births
1983 deaths
Baseball players from Los Angeles
Columbus Red Birds players
Los Angeles Angels (minor league) players
Major League Baseball catchers
Minor league baseball coaches
Nashville Vols players
New York Giants (NL) coaches
New York Giants (NL) players
St. Louis Cardinals players
Shreveport Sports players
Los Angeles High School alumni
Tulsa Oilers (baseball) players